Alonzo Brandon Ephraim (born November 8, 1981) is a former American football and arena football offensive lineman. He played college football at Alabama.

Ephraim was originally signed as an undrafted free agent by the Philadelphia Eagles in 2003. In his career, he has also played for the Miami Dolphins and Cleveland Browns. In 2006, while with the Browns, he was suspended four games for violating the league's substance-abuse policy, after which he was waived by the Browns.

On July 27, 2007, Ephraim signed with the All American Football League to play for Team Alabama when the league began play.

High school career
Ephraim attended Wenonah High School, where he played center on offense and defensive end on defense. He was also the starting center on the school's basketball team. He was on the baseball and track teams as well. In 1998, as a senior he was selected as the Class 6A Offensive Lineman of the Year. He was a Super 12 (All-State) team Honorable Mention, along with future college teammates Dante Ellington and Saleem Rasheed. When he graduated he had a 3.2 GPA.

College career 
Ephraim received interest from schools such as Alabama, Michigan, UCLA, Notre Dame, Georgia Tech, Nebraska. In the end, he chose Alabama. As a true freshman, he appeared in just two games, for a total of 29 plays. He then played as a back-up for every game as a sophomore. He became a starter as a junior, and had 708 plays that season, the most among Alabama offensive linemen. He also recorded 118 knock-down blocks. He was a second-team All-America selection his senior year. He was also an All-SEC selection as a junior. As a senior, he was one of seven Alabama players selected as All-SEC. As a senior, he was named to the Rimington Trophy watchlist.

Professional career

National Football League
Ephraim went unselected in the 2003 NFL Draft. However, he signed as an undrafted free agent with the Philadelphia Eagles and played in 16 games as a rookie. In 2004, he played in 13 games with two starts at right guard for the Eagles. He was released on April 28, 2005. On August 2, 2005, he signed with the Miami Dolphins. In his lone season with the Dolphins, he played in 13 games, with three starts. In 2006, he signed as an unrestricted free agent with the Cleveland Browns but was suspended for four games for violating the league's substance-abuse policy. He was waived after he completed his suspension. Over his four-year NFL career, he played in a total of 43 games.

Arena Football League
On April 24, 2008, Ephraim signed with the New York Dragons of the Arena Football League and played in three games as a rookie.

All American Football League
At the All American Football League's national try-outs held on July 27, 2007, Ephraim, along with fellow Alabama alumni Reggie Myles and Marcus Spencer, signed with the league to play for Team Alabama. However, the league postponed their inaugural season until 2009.

See also 
 List of Philadelphia Eagles players
 List of Miami Dolphins players
 List of Arena Football League and National Football League players

Notes

External links 
 New York Dragons bio
 at Yahoo! Sports bio

1981 births
Living people
Players of American football from Birmingham, Alabama
American football centers
Alabama Crimson Tide football players
University of Alabama alumni
Philadelphia Eagles players
Miami Dolphins players
Cleveland Browns players
New York Dragons players